Plateaux is one of Togo's five regions.

Atakpamé is the regional capital. It is the largest region in terms of area and has the second largest population (after the Maritime Region). Other major cities in the Plateaux region include Kpalimé and Badou. The highest point of the country, Mount Agou, is located within this region.

Plateaux is located north of Maritime Region and south of Centrale Region. In the west, it borders the Volta Region of Ghana, and in the east it borders three departments of Benin: Collines to the northeast; Zou to the east; and Kouffo to the southeast.

Plateaux is divided into the prefectures of: 
Agou Prefecture 
Amou Prefecture 
Danyi Prefecture 
Est-Mono Prefecture 
Haho Prefecture 
Kloto Prefecture 
Moyen-Mono Prefecture 
Ogou Prefecture 
Wawa Prefecture

See also

 Regions of Togo

References

 
Plateaux Region